Honoratus Halling (14 November 1819 – 9 April 1886) was a Norwegian priest, magazine editor and non-fiction writer.

He was born at Odalen (now Nord-Odal) in Hedmark, Norway.  He was the son of parish priest Peter Herman Halling (1777–1825) and Nikoline Moe (1787–1865). He took a theological degree at the University of Christiania in 1843 and subsequently held various clerical positions. In 1858, he was a parish priest at Horten in Vestfold. He became mayor of Horten, but resigned after a year. He was priest of Lom in Oppland (1864-1875) and took the same position in Østre Aker (1875-1885).

During the mid 1800s, he resided in the Enerhaugen neighborhood of Christiania (now Oslo).
He started the magazine For Fattig og Riig in 1848, which he edited from 1848 to 1855. He founded the organization Samfundet paa Enerhougen in 1850. Among his books are En liden Postille for Børn from 1846, and Husandagtsbog from 1860.

He was married in 1844 to Fredrikke Petrine Weyergang (1820-1860). After her death, he married Marie Henrikke Bomhoff (1837-1907). He was the father of Sigurd Halling, grandfather of Else Halling, and uncle of Louis Moe. He died in the neighborhood of Ljan in Oslo, Norway during 1886.

References

1819 births
1886 deaths
People from Nord-Odal
University of Oslo alumni
19th-century Norwegian Lutheran clergy
Norwegian non-fiction writers
Norwegian magazine editors